This is a list of Dutch television related events from 1964.

Events

Debuts

Television shows

1950s
NOS Journaal (1956–present)
Pipo de Clown (1958-1980)

1960s
Stiefbeen en Zoon (1964-1971)

Ending this year

Births
31 March - Caroline Tensen, TV presenter
8 July - Linda de Mol, TV presenter & actress

Deaths